Podognatha is a genus of moths belonging to the subfamily Olethreutinae of the family Tortricidae.

Species
Podognatha opulenta (Diakonoff, 1973)
Podognatha rebellis (Meyrick, 1931)
Podognatha tamias Diakonoff, 1966
Podognatha vinculata (Meyrick, 1916)

See also
List of Tortricidae genera

References

External links
tortricidae.com

Tortricidae genera
Olethreutinae
Taxa named by Alexey Diakonoff